Vasile Stefu (born 26 July 2000) is a Moldovan footballer who plays as a forward for Olimp Comrat.

Career
On 22 February 2021, Stefu signed for Zimbru Chișinău. He left the club after the end of the 2020–21 season, when he joined Olimp Comrat.

References

External links

2000 births
Living people
Moldovan footballers
Moldova youth international footballers
Moldova under-21 international footballers
Moldovan Super Liga players
FC Academia Chișinău players
FC Spicul Chișcăreni players
FC Florești players
FC Zimbru Chișinău players
Association football forwards